Hòn Bà is an islet in the Bà Rịa–Vũng Tàu province of Vietnam. The islet is known for its temple.

Uninhabited islands of Vietnam
Landforms of Bà Rịa-Vũng Tàu province